This is a list of genetic hybrids which is limited to well documented cases of animals of differing species able to create hybrid offspring which may or may not be infertile.

Hybrids should not be confused with genetic chimeras, such as that between sheep and goat known as the geep. Wider interspecific hybrids can be made via in vitro fertilization or somatic hybridization, however the resulting cells are not able to develop into a full organism.

Nomenclature
The naming of hybrid animals depends on the sex and species of the parents. The father giving the first half of his species' name and the mother the second half of hers. (I.e. a pizzly bear has a polar bear father and grizzly bear mother whereas a grolar bear's parents would be reversed.)

Animals

Phylum Chordata 
Chordate

 Class Chondrichthyes
 Order Carcharhiniformes
 Family Carcharhinidae
 Genus Carcharhinus
 A group of about 50 hybrids between Australian blacktip shark and the larger common blacktip shark was found by Australia's East Coast in 2012. This is the only known case of hybridization in sharks.
 Class Actinopterygii
 Order Acipenseriformes
 In 2020 hybrids were announced from different families of fish, American paddlefish (Polyodon spathula) and Russian sturgeon (Acipenser gueldenstaedtii). Accidentally created by Hungarian scientists, they are dubbed "sturddlefish."
 Order Cichliformes
 Family Cichlidae
 Blood parrot cichlid, which is probably created by breeding a redhead cichlid and a Midas cichlid (Amphilophus citrinellus) or red devil cichlid (Amphilophus labiatus). It was bred in 1986 in Taiwan.
Order Perciformes
Family Centrarchidae 
Subfamily Lepominae 
Genus Lepomis 
Greengill sunfish, a hybrid between a bluegill (Lepomis macrochirus) and green sunfish (Lepomis cyanellus).
Pumpkinseed x bluegill sunfish, a hybrid between a pumpkinseed (Lepomis gibbosus) and a bluegill (Lepomis macrochirus).
 Class Amphibia
 Order Urodela
 Family Ambystomatidae
 Genus Ambystoma
 In 2007 hybrids of a California tiger salamander and a barred tiger salamander were discovered to be able to survive easier than their parent species.
 Class Reptilia
 Order Squamata
 Suborder Anguimorpha
 Family Varanidae
 Genus Varanus
 Subgenus Varanus
 Hybrid between Varanus panoptes horni and Varanus gouldii flavirufus.
 Superfamily Lacertoidea
 Family Teiidae
 Hybrid between Aspidoscelis exsanguis and Aspidoscelis inornatus.
 Hybrids between the yellow ball python and the woma python.
 Hybrids between the ball python and the Borneo short-tailed python.
 The hybrid Borneo bat eater, between a Burmese python and reticulated python, can be further hybridized with another reticulated python.
 Hybrids between Ball python and reticulated python.
 Genus Python
 Around 2018, 13 hybrids of Burmese pythons (Python bivittatus) and Indian pythons (Python molurus) among 400 invasive Burmese pythons studied in South Florida were found by the United States Geological Survey.
 Family Boidae
 Hybrids between Columbian boa and yellow anaconda.
 Genus Corallus
 Hybrid between emerald tree boa and Amazon tree boa.
 Family Colubridae
 A fertile cross between a king snake and a corn snake. One example is a cross between a California kingsnake and a corn snake called the "jungle corn snake."
 Genus Lampropeltis
 A fertile cross between a California kingsnake and Pueblan milk snake is called an "imperial Pueblan milk snake."
 A fertile cross between a California kingsnake and whitesided black rat snake (Pantherophis obsoletus).
 L. triangulum
 A fertile cross between an imperial Pueblan milk snake and Honduran milk snake.
 Infraorder Gekkota
 Family Diplodactylidae
 Hybrid of chahoua gecko and crested gecko.
 Order Crocodilia
 Family Crocodylidae
 Genus Crocodylus
 Hybridization between the endemic Cuban crocodile (Crocodylus rhombifer) and the widely distributed American crocodile (Crocodylus acutus) is causing conservation problems for the former species as a threat to its genetic integrity.
It is likely that wild hybridization occurred historically in parts of southeast Asia.
 Order Testudines
 Suborder Cryptodira
 Superfamily Chelonioidea
 Family Cheloniidae
 A hybrid between a hawksbill sea turtle (Eretmochelys imbricata) and loggerhead sea turtle (Caretta caretta).
 Superfamily Testudinoidea
 Family Testudinidae
 A hybrid between a sulcata tortoise (Centrochelys sulcata) and leopard tortoise (Stigmochelys pardalis).
 Family Emydidae
 Subfamily Deirochelyinae
 Hybrid between red-eared slider and Ouachita map turtle.
 Genus Trachemys
 Species T. scripta
 The hybrid between a red-eared slider and a yellow-bellied slider.
 Class Mammalia
 Clade Ungulata
 Order Perissodactyla
 Suborder Hippomorpha
 Family Equidae – Equid hybrids
 Horses can breed with Przewalski's horse to produce fertile hybrids. 
 Mule, a cross of female horse and a male donkey.
 Hinny, a cross between a female donkey and a male horse. Mule and hinny are examples of reciprocal hybrids.
 Kunga, a cross between a donkey and a Syrian wild ass.
 Zebroids
 Zeedonk or zonkey, a zebra/donkey cross.
 Zorse, a zebra/horse cross
 Zony or zetland, a zebra/pony cross ("zony" is a generic term; "zetland" is specifically a hybrid of the Shetland pony breed with a zebra)
 Superfamily Rhinocerotoidea
 Family Rhinocerotidae
 Hybrids between black and white rhinoceroses have been recognized.
 Order Artiodactyla
 Family Bovidae – Bovid hybrids
 Subfamily Bovinae
 Dzo, zo or yakow; a cross between a domestic cow/bull and a yak.
 Beefalo, a cross of an American bison and a domestic cow. This is a fertile breed; this, along with mitochondrial DNA evidence, has led bison to occasionally be classified in the genus Bos.
 Zubron, a hybrid between wisent (European bison) and domestic cow.
 Yakalo, a hybrid between a bison and a yak.
 Fertile hybrids between bongos (Tragelaphus eurycerus) and sitatungas (Tragelaphus spekii) have occurred in captivity.
 Subfamily Caprinae
 Sheep-goat hybrids, such as the toast of Botswana.
 Family Camelidae
 Cama, a cross between a male dromedary and a female llama, also an intergeneric hybrid.
 Dromedary and Bactrian camels can crossbreed and produce a one large-humped Hybrid camel.
 Huarizo, a cross between a male llama and a female alpaca.
 Infraorder Cetacea
 Family Balaenopteridae
 Hybrids between blue whales (Balaenoptera musculus) and fin whales (Balaenoptera physalus) have been recorded.
 Family Delphinidae
 Wholphin, a fertile but very rare cross between a false killer whale and a bottlenose dolphin.
 In 2014, DNA analysis showed the clymene dolphin (Stenella clymene) to be a naturally occurring hybrid species descended from the spinner dolphin (Stenella longirostris) and the striped dolphin (Stenella coeruleoalba).
 Family Monodontidae
 In 2019, a "Narluga" hybrid of a male beluga (Delphinapterus leucas) and a female narwhal (Monodon monoceros) was confirmed by DNA analysis.
 Order Carnivora
 Infraorder Arctoidea
 Family Ursidae
 Ursid hybrids, such as the grizzly-polar bear hybrid, occur between all species except for the giant panda.
 Suborder Feliformia
 Family Felidae (see Felid hybrids); various other wild cat crosses are known involving the lynx, bobcat, leopard, serval, etc.
 Subfamily Felinae
 Savannah cats are the hybrid cross between an African serval cat and a domestic cat
 Bengal cat, a cross between the Asian leopard cat and the domestic cat, one of many hybrids between the domestic cat and wild cat species. The domestic cat, African wild cat and European wildcat may be considered variant populations of the same species (Felis silvestris), making such crosses non-hybrids.
 Serengeti, a hybrid crossbreed of a Bengal and an Oriental Shorthair.
 Chausie, a hybrid between a jungle cat and domestic cat.
 Subfamily Pantherinae
 Genus Panthera
 Ligers and tigons (crosses between a lion and a tiger) and other Panthera hybrids such as the lijagulep.
 Species P. tigris
 A hybrid between a Bengal tiger and a Siberian tiger is an example of an intra-specific hybrid.
 Family Canidae
 Fertile canid hybrids occur between coyotes, wolves, dingoes, jackals and domestic dogs.
 Family Mustelidae
 Polecat–ferret hybrids and polecat–mink hybrids.
 Order Primates
 Suborder Haplorhini
 Infraorder Simiiformes
 Family Hominidae
 Genus Pongo
 Hybrid orangutan, a hybrid between a Bornean orangutan and Sumatran orangutan.
 Genus Homo
 Some living Homo sapiens have genes from the extinct Homo neanderthalensis indicating hybridization in the past
 Order Proboscidea
 Family Elephantidae
 At Chester Zoo in the United Kingdom, a cross between an African elephant (male) and an Asian elephant (female). The male calf was named Motty. It died of intestinal infection after ten days.
 Class Aves
 Order Strigiformes
 Family Strigidae
 Genus Strix
 Hybrids between spotted owls and barred owls
 Order Passeriformes
 The domestic canary (Serinus canaria var. domesticus, family Fringillidae) has hybridized with other perching birds including the blue-black grassquit (Volatinia jacarina, family Thraupidae), the chestnut-capped blackbird (Agelaius ruficapillus, family Icteridae), and the red fody (Foudia madagascariensis, family Ploceidae). A fertile egg was made from the domestic canary and the chestnut-shouldered petronia (Petronia xanthocollis, family Passeridae) but there has been no mention of hatched hybrids.
 The red-crested cardinal (Paroaria coronata, family Thraupidae) has hybridized between the northern cardinal (Cardinalia cardinalis, family Cardinalidae), shiny cowbird (Molothrus bonariensis, family Icteridae), and chestnut-capped blackbird.
 The yellowhammer (Emberiza citrinella, family Emberizidae) has hybridized with the European greenfinch (Carduelis chloris) and the European goldfinch (Carduelis carduelis), both of the family Fringillidae.
 The cut-throat (Amadina fasciata, family Estrildidae) has hybridized with the Eurasian linnet (Carduelis cannabina, family Fringillidae) and the orange bishop (Euplectes franciscanus, family Ploceidae).
 Family Fringillidae
 Cagebird breeders sometimes breed hybrids between species of finch, such as goldfinch x canary. These birds are known as mules.
 Order Psittacidae
 Subfamily Arinae
 Tribe Arini
 Numerous macaw hybrids are also known.
 Order Accipitriformes
 Family Accipitridae
 Red kite and black kite: five bred unintentionally at a falconry center in England. (It is reported that the black kite (the male) refused female black kites but mated with two female red kites.)
 Red-shouldered hawk (Buteo lineatus) and common black hawk (Buteogallus anthracinus): one and possibly two offspring produced naturally in Sonoma County, California, US.
 Order Falconiformes
 Family Falconidae
 Genus Falco
 Hybrids between gyrfalcons and sakers are known
 Order Anseriformes
 Family Anatidae
 The mulard duck, hybrid of the domestic Pekin duck and domesticated Muscovy ducks.
 Brewer's duck, hybrid of the mallard and gadwall.
 Genus Anas
 In Australia, New Zealand and other areas where the Pacific black duck occurs, it is hybridised by the much more aggressive introduced mallard. This is a concern to wildlife authorities throughout the affected area, as it is seen as genetic pollution of the black duck gene pool.
 Hybrids between Greylag goose (Anser anser) and Canada goose (Branta canadensis).
 Order Galliformes
 Gamebird hybrids, hybrids between gamebirds and domestic fowl, including chickens, guineafowl and peafowl, interfamilial hybrids.
 Family Phasianidae
 Genus Tetrao
 Western capercaillies are known to hybridise occasionally with black grouse (these hybrids being known by the German name rackelhahn) and the closely related black-billed capercaillie.

Phylum Arthropoda 
 Class Insecta
 Order Hymenoptera
 Family Apidae
 Genus Apis
 Killer bees were created in an attempt to breed tamer and more manageable bees. This was done by crossing a European honey bee and an African bee, but instead the offspring became more aggressive and highly defensive bees that have escaped into the wild.
 Order Blattodea
 Family Rhinotermitidae
 Genus Coptotermes
 The Asian termite and Formosan termite are an invasive hybrid in Florida.
 Order Lepidoptera
 Family Nymphalidae
 Genus: Limenitis 
 The white admiral, Limenitis arthemis, and the viceroy (Limenitis archippus) can breed with each other and produce a hybrid known as a Rubidus
 Family Pieridae
 Genus: Colias
 Colias eurytheme and C. philodice butterflies have enough genetic compatibility to produce viable hybrid offspring. Hybrid speciation may have produced Heliconius butterflies, but that is disputed.
 Family Papilionidae
 Genus Battus
 The Coeruloaurean swallowtail is a hybrid produced by a Pipevine swallowtail (Battus philenor) mating with a Goldrim swallowtail (Battus polydamas). As the ranges of these two species overlap, the hybrid can be encountered in nature.

Plants 
 Clade Tracheophytes
 Clade Angiosperms
 Clade Monocots
 Clade Commelinids
 Order Poales
 Family Poaceae
 Subfamily Pooideae
 Supertribe Triticodae
 Tribe Triticeae
 Triticale, a grain crop, came from a cross of wheat (Triticum) and rye (Secale)
 Clade Eudicots
 Clade Rosids
 Order Sapindales
 Family Sapindaceae
 In 1994, a hybrid was made between longan (Dimocarpus longana) and lychee (Litchi chinensis)
 A list of plants that can hybridize under the same genus (Interspecific introgression, allopolyploid origin, and interspecific hybrid origin) can be found here: List of plant hybrids

References

Hybrid animals
Intergeneric hybrids